The Yokosuka H7Y (Allied reporting name: Tillie) (long designation: Yokosuka Experimental Kusho 12-shi Flying-boat) was a prototype Japanese flying boat of the Imperial Japanese Navy during the Second World War.

Development 
In 1937, the Imperial Navy of Japan formulated the technical task of the 12-Ci for the construction of a forward three- or four-engined flying boat. The maximum flight range was 9250 km with a bomb load of 1600 kg. Such a large range of flight was due to the desire of the fleet to cause torpedo-bombing strikes on the ships of the US Navy in Pearl Harbor without intermediate refueling at sea. The development of the aircraft was assigned to the design team of the 1st Fleet Arsenal in Yokosuka, headed by Jun Okamura.

The project was carefully classified, no one except the developers knew about it. However, it is known that the H7Y was four-engined, with Junkers Jumo 205C radial engines, which were purchased in Germany. In addition, Japanese designers studied the development of the German aircraft Dornier Do 26.

The first and only prototype was built in 1939. It was a flying boat with a high-placed wing and four engines. The designers attached great importance to the aerodynamic characteristics of the aircraft, so the fuselage, wing and engine bonnet had a minimum number of protruding parts. To increase the range, it was necessary to donate a defensive weapon. The H7Y was intended to conduct reconnaissance missions over Hawaii from Micronesia.

In the course of flight tests, the H7Y, which was as light as possible, showed unsatisfactory results. The fuselage was not tight enough. During the take-off, the wings were too dangerous to fluctuate. Due to the lack of engine power, taking off from the water was difficult. Attempts by the designers to reinforce the structure of the glider led to an increase in mass, which made it impossible to reach the Hawaiian Islands without refueling. And with refueling in the sea from submarines strike at Pearl Harbor could design a flying boat Kawanishi H8K, which could carry a significant bomb load and was well protected. Thus, in 1940, the Yokosuka H7Y program was cancelled.

Although the Yokosuka H7Y project was extremely secretive, TAI gave it the codename name "Tillie".

Specifications

Notes

References

H7Y
H7Y, Yokosuka
Flying boats
Four-engined tractor aircraft
Parasol-wing aircraft
Aircraft first flown in 1939
Four-engined piston aircraft